Lincoln-Villa is a neighborhood in Pasadena, California. It is bordered by Mountain Street to the north, Walnut Street to the south, Lincoln Avenue and Orange Grove Boulevard to the west, and Fair Oaks Avenue to the east.

Landmarks
Lincoln-Villa's central plaza covers a couple of city blocks around the intersection of Fair Oaks Avenue and Orange Grove Boulevard, in addition to commercial developments on Fair Oaks, Villa Street, and Peoria Street. The neighborhood is also home to Pasadena's central post office.
Much of the neighborhood was destroyed in the late 1960s to make way for the intersection of the 210, 710, and 134 Freeways.
Lincoln-Villa has some of Pasadena's heaviest street traffic, as a result of the aforementioned freeway interchange and the neighborhood's position between Downtown and the Rose Bowl.

Education
Lincoln-Villa is served by Cleveland and Roosevelt Elementary Schools, Washington Middle School, and John Muir High School.

Transportation
Lincoln-Villa is served by Metro Local lines 256 and 660. The neighborhood is also served by Pasadena Transit routes 20, 51, and 52.

Neighborhoods in Pasadena, California